CAMT may refer to:

Center for Arts Management and Technology
Congenital Amegakaryocytic Thrombocytopenia 
Commission on Accreditation of Medical Transport Systems
A message definition for cash management transactions according to the ISO 20022 standard for electronic data interchange between financial institutions